The First may refer to:

 The First (album), the first Japanese studio album by South Korean boy group Shinee
 The First (musical), a musical with a book by critic Joel Siegel
 The First (TV channel), an American conservative opinion network
 The First (TV series), a drama television series created by Beau Willimon
 The First 48, an American documentary television series on A&E
 The First Evil (also "The First"), a fictional character created by Joss Whedon for the TV series Buffy the Vampire Slayer

See also

 Das Erste, the principal publicly owned television channel in Germany
 La 1ère (disambiguation), "Première"
 First (disambiguation)